Richard Owen Alfred Norris (10 December 1931 – 25 August 2012) was a British field hockey player who competed in the 1952 Summer Olympics in Helsinki, winning a bronze medal.

He was the youngest member of the British field hockey team, which won the bronze medal. He played all three matches as forward. Norris was among the surviving team members who had a reunion at the London Olympics to celebrate the 60th Anniversary of their medal winning achievement.

External links
 
profile
Richard Norris' obituary

1931 births
2012 deaths
British male field hockey players
Olympic field hockey players of Great Britain
Field hockey players at the 1952 Summer Olympics
Olympic bronze medallists for Great Britain
Olympic medalists in field hockey
Medalists at the 1952 Summer Olympics